Hong Leong Capital Berhad is an investment holding company listed on the Bursa Malaysia whereby its subsidiaries are involved in stock and share broking, acting as agent and nominee for clients, corporate advisory services, fund management, unit trusts, share financing, futures and options broking. It is part of the Hong Leong Group conglomerate.

References

External links

1991 establishments in Malaysia
Companies listed on Bursa Malaysia
Investment management companies of Malaysia